Dr. Vera Lúcia Tavares Petterle (born October 31, 1949) is a Brazilian doctor and beauty queen who won Miss World 1971. Today she continues with her charity work helping underprivileged children in her free time by giving medical needs and care to them.

Biography
Lúcia Tavares Petterle was born in Rio de Janeiro, October 31, 1949. She spent her teenage years in Santa Maria, Rio Grande do Sul, where her father served in the military. Back in Rio, Lucia began participating in beauty contests for fun, while studying medicine at the University Gama Filho, specializing in endocrinology. She was elected Miss Tijuca Tennis Club - the last to sign up and with peer pressure - for which she fought and won the Miss State of Guanabara. Representing Guanabara State, she won the Miss World position in the national pageant, earning her the right to compete as Brazil's delegate in the Miss World pageant in London. She became the first woman from her country and the fourth South American woman to win the title.

After her reign, she went on to finish her medical studies and became a doctor.

External links
 https://web.archive.org/web/20071112035332/http://www.geocities.com/kingdomofmissworld/world1971-1980.html

Living people
1949 births
Brazilian female models
Miss World winners
Miss World 1971 delegates
People from Rio de Janeiro (city)
Brazilian beauty pageant winners
Brazilian women physicians
Brazilian endocrinologists